We is a 1982 German science fiction film written by , directed by Vojtěch Jasný and produced by German TV network ZDF. The film presents a world of harmony and conformity within a united state of technocratic progressivism. It is based on the 1921 novel We by the Russian writer Yevgeny Zamyatin.

Plot
One thousand years after the One State's conquest of the entire world, the spaceship Integral is being built in order to invade and conquer extraterrestrial planets. Meanwhile, the project's chief engineer, D-503, begins a diary that he intends to be carried upon the completed spaceship.

Cast

 Dieter Laser as D-503
 Sabine von Maydell as I-330
 Gert Haucke as S-4710
 Joachim Dietmar Mues as Erster Arzt
 Susanne Altschul as O-90
 Giovanni Früh as R-13
 Wolfgang Kaven as D-504
 Dieter G. Knichel as Zweiter Arzt
 Kurt Lambrigger as Delinquent
 Marga Maasberg as Altes Weib
 Heinz Moog as Wohltäter
 Hanna Ruess as U-27

See also 
 The Glass Fortress, a 2016 film based on the same novel

References

External links
 

1982 television films
1982 films
Dystopian films
Films based on Russian novels
Films based on science fiction novels
Films based on works by Yevgeny Zamyatin
1980s German-language films
German-language television shows
German science fiction films
German television films
West German films
ZDF original programming
1980s German films